17 Eridani is a single star in the equatorial constellation of Eridanus. It has the Bayer designation v Eridani, while 17 Eridani is the Flamsteed designation. This object is visible to the naked eye as a faint, white-hued star with an apparent visual magnitude of 4.74. It is moving further from the Earth with a heliocentric radial velocity of around +15 km/s.

Houk and Swift (1999) found a stellar classification of B9 III for this star, while Cowley et al. (1969) show B9 Vs. Stellar models suggest this is a main-sequence star, which indicates it is generating energy through hydrogen fusion at its core. It is about 178 million years old with 3.55 times the mass of the Sun and around 3.2 times the size of the Sun. These coordinates are a source for X-ray emission, which may be coming from an unresolved companion.

References 

B-type main-sequence stars
B-type giants
Eridanus (constellation)
Eridani, v
Durchmusterung objects
Eridani, 17
021790
016341
1070